Angelo Zgorelec is the founder of the first British personal computer magazine Personal Computer World (PCW).

Biography 
Croatian-born Zgorelec published the first issue of Personal Computer World in February 1978, publishing 16 monthly issues himself. In August 1979, Felix Dennis took a majority stake in the magazine and the exhibition PCW Show. Two years later, the magazine was sold to Dutch company VNU.

Zgorelec continued in publishing for the next 20 years with some smaller titles such as Office at Home, Practical Electronics, Program Now and Astronomy Now, which was edited by Sir Patrick Moore. He also started the European astronomy show Astrofest. Both of these ventures are still going strong almost 30 years later.

References 

Living people
British people of Croatian descent
British publishers (people)
Year of birth missing (living people)